Zdenĕk Váňa (born 7 February 1939) is a Czech sprinter. He competed in the men's 400 metres at the 1960 Summer Olympics.

References

1939 births
Living people
Athletes (track and field) at the 1960 Summer Olympics
Czech male sprinters
Olympic athletes of Czechoslovakia
Place of birth missing (living people)